Nyom is a surname. Notable people with the surname include:

Allan Nyom (born 1988), a Cameroonian footballer
Jules Alex Nyom (born 1984), a Cameroonian footballer